Dry Brook is a river in Delaware County, New York. It drains into an unnamed creek which flows into Trout Brook southeast of Peakville.

References

Rivers of New York (state)
Rivers of Delaware County, New York